Belmont is an unincorporated community in Anderson County, in the U.S. state of Tennessee.

Belmont is derived from the French meaning "beautiful mountain.

References

Unincorporated communities in Anderson County, Tennessee
Unincorporated communities in Tennessee